Michael David Hinckley (born October 5, 1982) is an American former professional baseball pitcher. He grew up in Moore, Oklahoma, where he played high school baseball. He and his wife LeAnna have four children, Cora, Isaac,  Livingstone, and Rory.

Baseball career
Hinckley was a 3rd round draft pick by the Montreal Expos (who became the Washington Nationals in 2005) in the 2001 Major League Baseball Draft, as a senior at Moore High School in Moore, Oklahoma. He was added to the Nationals 40-man roster in September  and called up to the majors on September 1, making his debut the next day and pitching 1 scoreless innings in relief against the Philadelphia Phillies.

On November 25, 2009, the Baltimore Orioles signed Hinckley to a minor league deal.

On December 21, 2010, the Toronto Blue Jays signed Hinckley to a minor league contract with an invitation to spring training. He was released on June 27, 2011, after recording a 5.68 ERA in the Blue Jays minor league system.

References

External links

1982 births
Living people
Washington Nationals players
Baseball players from Oklahoma
Major League Baseball pitchers
Gulf Coast Expos players
Vermont Expos players
Brevard County Manatees players
Savannah Sand Gnats players
Harrisburg Senators players
Potomac Nationals players
Columbus Clippers players
Oklahoma City RedHawks players
Bowie Baysox players
Norfolk Tides players
Sportspeople from Oklahoma City
People from Moore, Oklahoma